133 may refer to:

133 (number)
AD 133
133 BC
133 (song)
133 (New Jersey bus)